Michael Tiang Ming Tee (born 23 April 1973) is a Malaysian politician and lawyer  who has served as Member of the Sarawak State Legislative Assembly (MLA) for Pelawan since December 2021. He has served as the State Deputy Minister of Public Health and Housing under Premier Abang Abdul Rahman Zohari Abang Openg since January 2022. He is a member of the Sarawak United Peoples' Party (SUPP), a component party of the ruling Gabungan Parti Sarawak (GPS) coalition in Sarawak. He was a member of the Democratic Action Party (DAP) until 2005, when he announced his departure from the party.

Election results

Honours

Honours of Malaysia 
  :
 Officer of the Most Exalted Order of the Star of Sarawak (PBS) (2021)

References

External links 
 Michael Tiang Ming Tee on Facebook

1973 births
Living people
Malaysian politicians of Chinese descent
Members of the Sarawak State Legislative Assembly
Sarawak United Peoples' Party politicians
People from Sarawak
Alumni of Cardiff University